A trade association, also known as an industry trade group, business association, sector association or industry body, is an organization founded and funded by businesses that operate in a specific industry. An industry trade association participates in public relations activities such as advertising, education, publishing, lobbying, and political donations, but its focus is collaboration between companies. Associations may offer other services, such as producing conferences, holding networking or charitable events, or offering classes or educational materials. Many associations are non-profit organizations governed by bylaws and directed by officers who are also members.

In countries with a social market economy, the role of trade associations is often taken by employers' organizations, which also take a role in social dialogue.

Political influence

One of the primary purposes of trade groups, particularly in the United States, is to attempt to influence public policy in a direction favorable to the group's members. It can take the form of contributions to the campaigns of political candidates and parties through political action committees (PACs); contributions to "issue" campaigns not tied to a candidate or party; and lobbying legislators to support or oppose particular legislation. In addition, trade groups attempt to influence the activities of regulatory bodies.

In the United States, direct contributions by PACs to candidates are required to be disclosed to the Federal Election Commission or state and local election overseers; are considered public information; and have registration requirements for lobbyists. Even so, it can sometimes be difficult to trace the funding for issue and non-electoral campaigns.

Publishing
Almost all trade associations are heavily involved in publishing activities in print and online. The main media published by trade associations are as follows:
 Association website. The association's corporate website typically explains the association's aims and objectives, promotes the association's products and services, explains the benefits of membership to prospective members, and promotes members' businesses (for example, by means of an online listing of members and description of their businesses).
 Members newsletters or magazines. Whether produced in print or online, association newsletters and magazines contain news about the activities of the association, industry news and editorial features on topical issues. Some are exclusively distributed to members, while others are used to lobby lawmakers and regulators, and some are used to promote members' businesses to potential new customers.
 Printed membership directories and yearbooks. Larger trade associations publish membership directories and yearbooks to promote their association to opinion formers, lawmakers, regulators and other stakeholders. Such publications also help to promote members' businesses both to each other and to a wider audience. A typical membership directory contains profiles of each association member, a products and services guide, advertising from members, and editorial articles about the aims, objectives and activities of the association. The emphasis of association yearbooks on the other hand is on editorial features about the association itself and the association's industry.

The opportunity to be promoted in such media (whether by editorial or advertising) is often an important reason why companies join a trade association in the first place.

Examples of larger trade associations that publish a comprehensive range of media include European Wind Energy Association (EWEA), Association of British Travel Agents (ABTA) and the Confederation of British Industry (CBI).

Generic advertising
Industry trade groups sometimes produce advertisements, just as normal corporations do. However, whereas typical advertisements are for a specific corporate product, such as a specific brand of cheese or toilet paper, industry trade groups advertisements generally are targeted to promote the views of an entire industry.

Ads to improve industry image
These ads mention only the industry's products as a whole, painting them in a positive light in order to have the public form positive associations with that industry and its products. For example, in the USA the advertising campaign "Beef. It's what's for dinner" is used by the National Cattlemen's Beef Association to promote a positive image of beef in the public consciousness.

Ads to shape opinion on a specific issue
These are adverts targeted at specific issues. For example, in the US in the early 2000s the Motion Picture Association of America (MPAA) began running advertisements before films that advocate against movie piracy over the Internet.

Controversy
A frequent criticism of trade associations is that, they are not per se "profit-making" organizations, but they are in reality fronts for cartels engaged in price-fixing, creating and maintaining barriers to entry of industry, and other subtle self-serving anti-competitive activities not in the public interest.

Anti-competitive activity
Jon Leibowitz, a commissioner at the Federal Trade Commission in the United States, outlined the potentially anti-competitive nature of some trade association activity in a speech to the American Bar Association in Washington, DC, in March 2005 called "The Good, the Bad and the Ugly: Trade Associations and Antitrust". For instance, he said that under the guise of "standard setting," trade associations representing the established players in an industry can set rules that make it harder for new companies to enter a market.

Cartels
In September 2007, the German trade association for Fachverband Verbindungs- und Befestigungstechnik (VBT) and five fastener companies were fined 303 million euros by the European Commission for operating cartels in the markets for fasteners and attaching machines in Europe and worldwide. In one of the cartels, the YKK Group, Coats plc, the Prym group, the Scovill group, A. Raymond, and Berning & Söhne "agreed [...] on coordinated price increases in annual 'price rounds' with respect to 'other fasteners' and their attaching machines, in the framework of work circles organised by VBT".

Copyright trade groups
 IFPI, the International Federation of Phonogram and Videogram Producers, represents the recording industry worldwide, with over 1450 members in 75 countries and affiliated industry associations in 48 countries. The IFPI works in partnership with similar national organizations:
 Recording Industry Association of America (RIAA) represents the recording industry in the United States
 ASINCOL, the Colombian Association of Phonograph Producers, Colombian music industry association
 Music Canada, formerly known as the Canadian Recording Industry Association is the non-profit trade organization representing the largest Canadian companies that create, manufacture and market sound recordings
 Recording Industry Association of New Zealand (RIANZ), non-profit trade association of producers and artists in New Zealand
 Mexican Association of Producers of Phonograms and Videograms (AMPROFON)
 Motion Picture Association (MPA) represents the film industry in the United States
 The Association of Japanese Animations (AJA), a group consisting of small to medium-sized intellectual property companies
 Business Software Alliance (BSA) promotes the intellectual property of software developers
 Entertainment Software Association (ESA) promotes the intellectual property of game developers in the United States
 British Phonographic Industry (BPI), UK music industry association. Founded the BRIT Awards, and give Gold, Silver and Platinum disks for UK-based sales
 Federation Against Copyright Theft (FACT) is the main UK anti-copyright infringement organization, mainly for films
 Australian Recording Industry Association (ARIA), oversees the collection, administration and distribution of music licenses and royalties in Australia
 Japanese Society for Rights of Authors, Composers and Publishers (JASRAC)
 Recording Industry Association of Japan (RIAJ)
 Russian Organization for Multimedia and Digital Systems (ROMS) organization on collective management of rights of authors and other rightholders in multimedia, digital networks and visual arts
 Anti Video Piracy Association of Singapore (AVPAS) for anime
 GEMA society for musical performing and mechanical reproduction rights in Germany

See also
 China Council for the Promotion of International Trade
 Commodity checkoff program
 Guild
 Inter-professional association
 List of food industry trade associations
 Professional association
 Trust (business)

References

Further reading
  This provides a comprehensive contemporaneous overview of trade associations and associated government activity, as of the early 20th century.
 Garrelts, Frank: Märkte im Umbruch – Kooperationen als Chance im Handel (Markets on the move – trade associations as a business opportunity), München: Beck 1998, abstract in English available here 
 
 The Swope Plan (Federal Trade Commission) – responsible for supervising trade associations established for each industry

 
Types of organization

zh:协会